This is a list of films produced by the Tollywood (Telugu language film industry) based in Hyderabad in the year 2006.

Box office

List of released films

Dubbed films

Notable deaths

References

2006
Telugu
2006 in Indian cinema